The Mid-Am Racing Series, formerly Mid American Stock Car Series, is an elite sportsman traveling stock car racing series in the Midwestern United States.  The cars are based on a 108" metric stock frame, less costly suspension parts and a maximum of 358 cubic inch engine. The car's roll cage and chassis were made of a design very similar to the same chassis a previous design of NASCAR cup chassis, but have also included more modern safety features such as plated door bars and the "Earnhardt bar" which runs from the roof to the dash.  The series runs primarily on paved racetracks but also appears on dirt and road courses.

History 
The series was founded in 1993 by Gary Vercauteran. The Series was at one time a support class for the ARTGO Challenge Series.  The Mid American corporation expanded to a traveling Supertruck Series named the Midwest Super Truck Series in 1995 and a traveling Super Late Model Series, named the Midwest All-Star Racing Series (MARS) in 1999.  The expansion also included the Stock Car Classics in 2004 and the American Stock Car League (ASL) in 2005.  The death of Vercauteran in October 2005 led to the purchase of Mid-American by longtime employees Doug and Julie Strasburg.  The Strasburgs kept only the Mid American Stock Car Series while MARS and ASL were dissolved.  The Stock Car Classics split into two groups (Classic Racing Series and Midwest Stock Car Classics). The Super Trucks were absorbed into the United States Super Trucks or USST.

Strasburg ownership era 
When the Strasburgs took over Mid American in 2006, the series was struggling with car counts and tracks willing to host races. The average car count average jumped from 20 entrants per race to 27. A season high 39 participants ran at the Milwaukee Mile during the Governor's Cup Weekend. Several tracks have renewed relationships with the Mid-American Stock Car Series such as the Golden Sands Speedway, Marshfield Super Speedway, Dells Raceway Park and Road America.

Gruenberg ownership era 
Dave Gruenberg took over ownership on October 22, 2014.  Working with Gary Vercauteran, Doug Stasburg, and Julie Stasburg previously made this an easy transition.

Go Racing Promotions era
The series was sold by Gruenberg to former La Crosse Fairgrounds Speedway flagman Greg Oliver in early February 2017.  Oliver ran both the Great Northern Sportsmen Series and Midwest Dash Series.  All three series became a part of the GO Racing Promotions organization.

Scrogham era
The Mid-American Stock Car Series was sold by Oliver to former Mid-Am competitor Tim Scrogham in early November 2020 and rebranded the Mid-Am Racing Series.

Tracks

The following tracks are scheduled to host at least one event in 2023:

Kankakee County Speedway (dirt oval)
Grundy County Speedway
Hawkeye Downs Speedway
La Crosse Fairgrounds Speedway
Madison International Speedway
Milwaukee Mile
Rockford Speedway
Sycamore Speedway (dirt oval)
Tomah-Sparta Raceway

Former tracks

141 Speedway – Francis Creek, Wisconsin (later became a dirt track)
Dodge County (WI) Fairgrounds (dirt exhibition)
Elko Speedway - Elko New Market, Minnesota
Blackhawk Farms Raceway
Golden Sands Speedway
Indiana State Fairgrounds
Lake Geneva Raceway – Lake Geneva, Wisconsin (track closed after 2006 season)
Lucas Oil Raceway at Indianapolis
Marshfield Motor Speedway
Michigan Ideal Speedway
Norway Speedway – Norway, Michigan
Road America – Elkhart Lake, Wisconsin
South Bend Speedway
State Park Speedway
Wisconsin International Raceway – Kaukauna, Wisconsin
Beaver Dam Raceway (dirt oval 2021)
Dells Raceway Park

Super Truck Series Race ONLY:
Raceway Park

List of series champions

List of Vercauteran Memorial winners

The series honors its founder Gary Vercauteran with a race each year after beginning as an event honoring his parents. The race was often held as part of the Red, White, and Blue state championship event at Wisconsin International Raceway (WIR). The 2007 event at WIR was rained out, so it was held at 141 Speedway which is the track next closed to Vercauteran's hometown Chilton. The 2010 event was held at Road America. It began in Vercauteran's hometown dirt track in Chilton before the series' origin. It has been held at a variety of tracks since then. The 25th annual Vercauteran Memorial winner returned to WIR and was won by Tyler Bauknecht (whose family had traveled with the Vercauteran family in the early days of the series). 
1990 Wayne Strand (Chilton)
1991 Larry Richards (Chilton)
1992 Jerry Wenzel (Chilton)
1993 Eddie Hoffman (WIR)
1994 Brian Lambie (WIR)
1995 Eddie Hoffman (WIR)
1996 Pat Kelly (WIR)
1997 Bill Prietzel (WIR)
1998 Pat Kelly (WIR)
1999 Gregg Haese (WIR)
2000 Mark Pluer (WIR)
2001 Peter Hernandez (WIR)
2002 Peter Hernandez (WIR)
2003 Jeremy Spoonmore (WIR)
2004 Bill Prietzel (WIR)
2005 Brett Piontek (WIR)
2006 James Swan (WIR)
2007 Kevin Damrow (141 Speedway)
2008 Jacob Finney (WIR)
2009 Gregg Haese (141 Speedway) 
2010 Bill Prietzel (Road America)
2011 Jacob Finney (Norway Speedway)
2012 Kenny Joosten (Rockford)
2013 James Swan (Rockford Speedway) 
2014 Tyler Bauknecht (Wisconsin International Raceway) 
2015 Lyle Nowak (State Park Speedway)
2016 Ron Vandemeier, Jr. (Rockford Speedway)--51st National Short Track Championships
2019 Ron Weyer (Milwaukee Mile)
2020 Rick Corso (Rockford Speedway)--55th National Short Track Championships
2021 Ron Vandemeier, Jr. (Rockford Speedway)--56th National Short Track Championships 
2022 James Swan (Rockford Speedway)--57th National Short Track Championships

Other divisions

Mid-American Super Trucks champions
1997 Terry Marzokfa
1998 Terry Marzofka
1999 Gordon Swanson 
2000 Danny Heinritz
2001 Jerry Seibel
2002 Jeff Steenbergen
2003 Donnie Woller
2004 Jamie Farrell
2005 Mark Storlie

MARS late model champions
1999 Lowell Bennett
2000 Lowell Bennett
2001 Todd Kluever
2002 Terry Baldry
2003 Jeff Van Oudenhoven
2004 Jeff Van Oudenhoven
2005 Jeff Van Oudenhoven

Midwest Stock Car Classics champions
2003 Chuck King
2004 Gary Stein
2005 John Vassh Jr.

References

External links

Official Mid-Am Racing Series Website

Stock car racing series in the United States
Auto racing organizations in the United States
Stock car racing
Motorsport in Wisconsin
Motorsport in Indianapolis
Motorsport in Indiana
Motorsport in Illinois
Motorsport in Michigan
Motorsport in Missouri
1993 establishments in the United States